The Tobago Hospitality and Tourism Institute, also known as THTI, is a state owned Institute in Tobago, Trinidad and Tobago founded in 1997. The Institute caters for graduates from the Secondary Schools or persons with experience in the world of tourism, hospitality and culinary arts. THTI has designed their programs ensuring that students are fully prepared through both theory and practical applications. The institute has a mix of associate degrees, Certificates (Short Courses) and Modular courses.

It is one of two Institutes in Trinidad and Tobago, that deal with tourism, hospitality and culinary studies, the other being the Trinidad and Tobago Hospitality and Tourism Institute (TTHTI).

References

External links 

 Tobago Hospitality and Tourism Institute

Tobago
Universities in Trinidad and Tobago
Educational institutions established in 1997
Cooking schools in North America
Hospitality schools
1997 establishments in Trinidad and Tobago